The 2010 Deadly Awards were hosted by Luke Carroll and Naomi Wenitong (of The Last Kinection) at the Sydney Opera House on 27 September 2010. Performers included Archie Roach, Dan Sultan, Christine Anu, Frank Yamma, Ali Mills and the Bangarra Dance Theatre. The Awards program will be broadcast on SBS and SBS Two on 3 and 6 October respectively. The awards event was an annual celebration of Australian Aboriginal and Torres Strait Islander achievement in music, sport, entertainment and community.

Music
Single Release of the Year: Dan Sultan - "Letter"
Album Release of the Year: Archie Roach - 1988
Male Artist of the Year: Dan Sultan
Female Artist of the Year: Naomi Wenitong
Outstanding Achievement in RNB and Hip Hop: The Last Kinection
Band of the Year: The Medics
Most Promising New Talent in Music: Busby Marou

Sport
Sportsman of the Year: Timana Tahu, NRL
Sportswoman of the Year: Josie Janz, netball
Outstanding Achievement in AFL: Nathan Lovett-Murray
Outstanding Achievement in NRL: Jamal Idris

The arts
Film of the Year: Bran Nue Dae
Live Production of the Year: The Sapphires
Male Actor of the Year: Rocky McKenzie
Female Actor of the Year: Deborah Mailman
Outstanding Achievement in Literature: Anita Heiss for Manhattan Dreaming
Dancer of the Year: Yolande Brown
Visual Artist of the Year: Walangari Karntawarra
Outstanding Achievement in TV: Message Stick - ABC
Television Personality of the Year: Wendell Sailor (The NRL Footy Show)

Community
Outstanding Achievement in Aboriginal and Torres Strait Islander Health: Dr Peter O'Mara, Australian Indigenous Doctors' Association.
Indigenous Health Worker of the Year: Colleen Carwood, Prince of Wales Hospital, NSW.
Outstanding Achievement in Aboriginal and Torres Strait Islander Employment: Swim For Life Program, YMCA Perth.
Outstanding Achievement in Cultural Advancement: Shane Phillips.
Community Broadcaster of the Year: Glen Crump, Mission Beat Moree.
Leader of the Year: Patricia Turner, NITV.
Outstanding Achievement in Aboriginal and Torres Strait Islander Education: St Teresa's Agricultural College, Abergowrie, Qld

References

External links
2010 Deadlys at Vibe

2010 in Australian music
The Deadly Awards
Indigenous Australia-related lists